The 1960 Minnesota lieutenant gubernatorial election took place on November 8, 1960. Incumbent Lieutenant Governor Karl Rolvaag of the Minnesota Democratic-Farmer-Labor Party defeated Republican Party of Minnesota challenger Art Ogle.

Results

External links
 Election Returns

Minnesota
Lieutenant Gubernatorial
1960